The Xingu-Rio HVDC transmission line is a 2543.4 km long 800 kV high-voltage direct current transmission line in Brazil between the Xingu substation at the city of Anapu in the Pará state, 17 km from the Belo Monte Dam, and the Terminal Rio substation at the city of Paracambi in the Rio de Janeiro state. It was inaugurated 22 August 2019.

See also

 Xingu-Estreito HVDC transmission line

References

Electric power infrastructure in Brazil
HVDC transmission lines